The following is a list of the nominations and awards that Gladiator received.

Organizations

Guilds
 American Film Institute
 AFI's 100 Years ... 100 Heroes and Villains:
 General Maximus Decimus Meridius – #50 Hero
 AFI's 100 Years ... 100 Movie Quotes:
 "Father to a murdered son. Husband to a murdered wife. And I will have my vengeance, in this life or the next." – Nominated
 AFI's 100 Years of Film Scores – Nominated
 AFI's 100 Years ... 100 Cheers – Nominated
 AFI's 100 Years ... 100 Movies (10th Anniversary Edition) – Nominated
 AFI's 10 Top 10 – Nominated Epic Film
 2001 American Cinema Editors Eddie Awards
 Best Edited Feature Film — Dramatic
 5th Art Directors Guild Awards
 Excellence in Production Design Award, Feature Film — Period or Fantasy Films

Critics groups
 London Film Critics Circle
 Actor of the Year (Russell Crowe)

References

External links
 

Lists of accolades by film
Accolades